Michael Ezra Mulyoowa was believed to be one of the wealthiest Africans. He was  reported to own Sunspace International, a holding company registered in the Seychelles, and a founding patron of the Ezra Track Team Board, a sports philanthropic financing and talent search agency. He used to a philanthropist and was known for his donations towards sporting causes in his home country in the late 2000s.

Early life
Born in Kampala, Uganda on 20 July 1973, Michael Ezra is a former Uganda national team sprinter.

He was born to Beatrice Nantongo, a retired Commissioner with the Uganda Police. He is the second of five siblings with two sisters, Hope and Beatrice, and two brothers, Patrick and Martin. He is an alumnus of Kitante Primary and Makerere College Schools.

Since around 2003 he has been a subject of intrigue in the local Ugandan media, especially the tabloids, being praised and vilified in almost equal measure.

The source (and true size) of his immense wealth remains a closely guarded secret. His known investment vehicle is SunSpace International. It is reported that his investments in Dubai (U.A.E.) alone stand at over $1.5 billion, with the bulk of it in real estate.

In the media

2003

 Made his first public appearance with a USh  sponsorship of the Uganda athletic team headed for the IAAF World Cross Country Championships in Lausanne, Switzerland.

2004

 ETTB established national athletics camps across Uganda with the aim of scouting talent.
 In February Michael Ezra unsuccessfully made a £60 million stg bid to buy then English Premiership club Leeds United, causing the club's shares to go up by 14% as a result.
 In March he extended sponsorship to boxing, where he spent roughly US$500,000 in a qualification campaign and a nine-month camp for the Uganda national boxing team, The Bombers, in the run-up to the 2004 Summer Olympics in Athens.
 In June he made the Government of Uganda a US$30 million offer to purchase the Uganda National Stadium (Mandela National Stadium). To date there was never an official response from the Government of Uganda.

2006
 In October he expanded ETTB's activities into football (soccer), by spending USh  to send a cash-strapped Uganda national team, The Cranes, to Niamey, Niger for an Africa Cup of Nations qualifier.
 In November he paid over a US$250,000 for an exclusive Mont Blanc wristwatch. The "one of one" timepiece was the object of an Emirates auction commemorating 100 years of Mont Blanc. The timepiece was handed over to the Ugandan Businessman by His Highness Sheik Ahmed bin Saeed Al-Maktoum in Dubai.
 In December he was named the man of the year by a public poll held annually by The New Vision, the largest media house in Uganda. He was the runner-up for four years: from 2003 and 2005 and in 2007; running up to the President of Uganda, Yoweri Museveni.

2007

 In September, he awarded The Cranes US$100,000. Awarding the coach $15,000, two assistant coaches $2,500 each and the 16 player squad $5,000 each after they beat Niger 3–1 in a qualifier.

2008

 In May he went shopping for an A380 from the French aircraft maker Airbus to be used as a private jet.

2009

 In July a US$5.93 million scam targeting him was discovered. The perpetrator was an American internet con artist.

2010

 In October while touring Nyayo Stadium in Nairobi Kenya, he informed the Daily Monitor of his offer to the Uganda Cranes of US$650,000 should they qualify to the 2012 African Cup of Nations in Equatorial Guinea and Gabon. He has also thrown in an additional US$50,000 if they won the Group J qualifier against Kenya's Harambee Stars on 9 October 2010 in Nairobi, Kenya. The $650,000 was broken down as follows: 18 Players – $30,000 each, Coach – $60,000, Assistant Coach(es) – $25,000, Goalkeeping Coach – $25,000.

2011

 In October he, true to his philanthropic style, said he will award the Uganda Cranes half of the earlier pledge of US$650,000 despite them not qualifying for the Africa Cup of Nations.

Controversies
In August 2010, upon arrival in his home country, the local media reported that Michael Ezra had not remitted taxes to the tune of USh 1.1 billion (approximately US$500,000) to the Uganda government. This prompted the tax body, the Uganda Revenue Authority (URA), to request a travel ban on him and the freezing of his assets.

In September 2010, he called a press conference at the luxurious Emin Pasha hotel in Kampala and displayed a stack of $3 million dollars as though to prove that he was not broke as alleged in the Ugandan media.

In February 2011, Michael Ezra was arrested by the Kenyan police. It was said Ezra had not honoured court summons to defend himself against allegations that he issued a cheque worth $200,000, which was dishonoured, to a Kenyan company. Ezra, through his lawyers, denied the charges. His lawyer argued that the offence was a misdemeanor and bailable. He further argued that Ezra was a prominent international businessman who owned numerous properties in Kenya and was not arrested but handed himself to the authorities and therefore was not a flight risk. The Judge granted him bail of KSh  ($78,000). Ezra's lawyer claimed in court that a Kenyan businessman was framing his client with the intention of extorting money from him.

In July 2013, he was acquitted on charges of issuing bounced cheques.

Honours & Public Recognition
He was NewVision's Man of the Year (2006) having been runner up to the President of Uganda, Yoweri Museveni, from 2003 to 2005 and later in 2007. Michael Ezra is entrenched in the hearts of many of his countrymen as a hero thanks to his philanthropic exploits, especially toward national teams in dire straits.

External Sources
 / Biggest transaction in travel retail. The Moddie Report 21 November 2006
 / Smile Train Charity dinner attracts notable guest. The Moddie Report 6 June 2007
 Ugandan tycoon orders second Airbus. Luxist 8 May 2008
 Businessman escapes $5.93 Million scam. The Gulf Today
 / Ugandan tycoon upbeat on bid. BBC News 11 February 2004
 Excited Ezra gives team $100,000 despite maths. The Daily monitor 27 September 2007
 Ezra extends support to arua. The Daily Monitor 13 October 2007
 Ezra supports local film. The Daily Monitor 22 December 2007
 Ezra supports Ugandan Boxing The Age 28 April 2004
 Ezra offers 1.6 Billion if cranes qualify The Daily Monitor 5 October 2010
 Ezra’s expensive affair with Kenyan court The Daily Monitor 14 July 2013

References 

Ugandan businesspeople in real estate
1973 births
Living people
People from Kampala